Azeddine Nouiri (born 21 July 1986) is a Moroccan wheelchair athlete who competes in throwing events. He won the F34 classification shot put competition at the 2012 and 2016 Paralympics, setting a world record at 13.10 metres in 2012. In the javelin throw he finished tenth and seventh, respectively. He served as the flag bearer for Morocco at the 2016 Summer Paralympics Parade of Nations.

At the 2013 IPC Athletics World Championships, Nouiri placed fourth in the shot put and lost his world record to Scott Jones.

References

External links 

 

1986 births
Sportspeople from Casablanca
Living people
Moroccan male javelin throwers
Moroccan male shot putters
Paralympic athletes of Morocco
Athletes (track and field) at the 2012 Summer Paralympics
Athletes (track and field) at the 2016 Summer Paralympics
Athletes (track and field) at the 2020 Summer Paralympics
Paralympic gold medalists for Morocco
Paralympic silver medalists for Morocco
Medalists at the 2012 Summer Paralympics
Medalists at the 2016 Summer Paralympics
Medalists at the 2020 Summer Paralympics
World record holders in Paralympic athletics
Paralympic medalists in athletics (track and field)